Musa Khiramanovich Manarov (born 22 March 1951) is a Lak former Soviet cosmonaut who spent 541 days in space.

He was a colonel in the Soviet Air Force and graduated from the Moscow Aviation Institute with an engineering qualification in 1974. Musa was selected as a cosmonaut on 1 December 1978.

From 21 December 1987 to 21 December 1988, he flew as flight engineer on Soyuz TM-4. The flight duration was 365 days 22 hours 38 minutes. From 2 December 1990 to 26 May 1991, he flew again as a flight engineer on Soyuz TM-11. The duration was 175 days, 1 hour, and 50 minutes, the longest continuous time spent in space by anyone at that time. During his 176-day stay, Manarov observed the Earth and worked in space manufacturing. He also performed more than 20 hours of spacewalks. Manarov lives in Russia.

Personal life
Manarov is married with two children. He is an ethnic Lak. He lives in Moscow, while his mother still lives in Baku.

Awards and honors
 Hero of the Soviet Union
 Pilot-Cosmonaut of the USSR
 Order of Lenin
 Order of the October Revolution
 Medal "For Merit in Space Exploration"
Foreign awards:
 Officer of the Legion of Honour (France)
 Order of Stara Planina (Republic of Bulgaria)
 Order of Georgi Dimitrov (Republic of Bulgaria)
 Order "The Sun of Freedom" (Afghanistan)

See also
List of Muslim astronauts

References

External links

1951 births
Living people
Military personnel from Baku
Laks (Caucasus)
Soviet cosmonauts
Spacewalkers
Mir crew members
Fifth convocation members of the State Duma (Russian Federation)
Heroes of the Soviet Union
Recipients of the Order of Lenin
Officiers of the Légion d'honneur
Recipients of the Medal "For Merit in Space Exploration"
Recipients of the Order of Georgi Dimitrov